David Perry Lindley (March 21, 1944 – March 3, 2023) was an American musician who founded the rock band El Rayo-X and worked with many other performers including Jackson Browne, Linda Ronstadt, Ry Cooder, Bonnie Raitt, Warren Zevon, Curtis Mayfield and Dolly Parton. He mastered such a wide variety of instruments that Acoustic Guitar magazine referred to him not as a multi-instrumentalist but instead as a "maxi-instrumentalist." On stage, Lindley was known for wearing garishly colored polyester shirts with clashing pants, gaining the nickname the Prince of Polyester.

The majority of the instruments that Lindley played are string instruments, including violin, acoustic and electric guitar, upright and electric bass, banjo, mandolin, dobro, hardingfele, bouzouki, cittern, bağlama, gumbus, charango, cümbüş, oud and zither. He was the unparalleled master of the lap steel guitar in the rock music sphere, and an expert in Hawaiian-style slide guitar blues. Multi-instrumentalist Ben Harper acknowledges Lindley as an important influence.

Lindley was a founding member of the 1960s psychedelic band Kaleidoscope and worked as musical director for several touring artists. He occasionally scored and composed music for film.

Early life and career
David Perry Lindley was born in San Marino, California, to Margaret and John Lindley on March 21, 1944. When Lindley was growing up in Los Angeles, his father had an extensive collection of 78 rpm records that included Korean folk and Indian sitar music, as well as Spanish classical guitarists Andrés Segovia and Carlos Montoya. Lindley took up the violin at age three, and kept at it despite breaking the fragile bridge. He then moved on to the baritone ukulele in his early teens. Next he learned the banjo. By his late teens, he won the Topanga Banjo•Fiddle Contest five times. He played banjo with the Dry City Scat Band which included multi-instrumentalist Chris Darrow, and Richard Greene on fiddle. Lindley and his bandmates aspired to emulate multi-talented folk singer Mike Seeger.

Lindley began to frequent the Los Angeles–area folk music scene of the 1960s, primarily going to the Ash Grove club, but also attending the Troubador in West Hollywood, encountering an eclectic assortment of music including flamenco, Russian folk music, and Indian sitar music. At Ash Grove, Lindley shared ideas with local musicians such as Ry Cooder and Chris Hillman. Lindley formed an especially close relationship with Cooder; the two shared a love of exotic music, and they both turned away from corporate mainstream music to focus on less popular idioms such as folk and roots music. At Ash Grove, Lindley learned the "right" way to play certain styles from traveling blues and folk musicians, and he learned violin methods from local star Don "Sugarcane" Harris.

From 1966 to 1970, Lindley was a founding member of the psychedelic band Kaleidoscope which released four albums on Epic Records during that period. After Kaleidoscope broke up, Lindley went to England and played in Terry Reid's band for a couple of years.  In 1972, he teamed up with Jackson Browne, and played in his band through 1980, and occasionally afterward. During the 1970s, he also toured as a member of the bands of Crosby-Nash, Linda Ronstadt and James Taylor.

In 1981, Lindley formed his own band, El Rayo-X.  Jackson Browne produced their first album.  Their last show was December 31, 1989.  After that, Lindley toured as a solo artist, first with Hani Naser accompanying on hand drums, then with reggae percussionist Wally Ingram.  He also played on a multitude of studio sessions.  Between his work in the studio as a session musician or on tour as a sideman or bandleader, Lindley learned new instruments. He was famous for having written the only song glorifying (a brand of) male condoms, "Ram-a-Lamb-a-Man," from his album Win this Record! The media often commented on his colorful polyester clothing, with jarring differences between pants and shirt, earning him the nickname Prince of Polyester.

Work with other artists

Lindley was known for his work as a session musician. He contributed to years of recordings and live performances by Jackson Browne, and also supported Warren Zevon, Linda Ronstadt, Curtis Mayfield, James Taylor, David Crosby, Graham Nash, Terry Reid, Dolly Parton, Bob Dylan, Bruce Springsteen, Toto, Rod Stewart, Joe Walsh and Dan Fogelberg. He collaborated with fellow guitarists Ry Cooder, Henry Kaiser and G. E. Smith. Artist Ben Harper credited Lindley's distinctive slide guitar style as a major influence on his own playing, and, in 2006, Lindley sat in on Harper's album Both Sides of the Gun. He was known in the guitar community for his use of "cheap" instruments sold at Sears department stores and intended for amateurs. He used these for the unique sounds they produce, especially with a slide. In the early 1990s, he toured and recorded with Hani Naser adding percussive instruments to his solo performances, and his instrumental repertoire which he used in his session work. Lindley also toured extensively and recorded with reggae percussionist Wally Ingram. 

Lindley's voice may be heard in the version of "Stay" performed by Jackson Browne. Browne's version is a continuation of "The Load Out", and its refrain is sung in progressively higher vocal ranges. The refrain of  "Oh won't you stay, just a little bit longer" is sung first by Browne, then by Rosemary Butler, then by Lindley in falsetto.

Lindley joined Jackson Browne for a tour of Spain in 2006. Love Is Strange: En Vivo Con Tino, a 2-CD set of recordings from that tour, was released  2010, with Browne and Lindley touring together starting in June of that year. They played together at Glastonbury Festival in 2010, and they won an Independent Music Award for Best Live Performance Album in 2011.

Instruments

Lindley had a large collection of rare and unusual guitars and other instruments from the Middle East and various parts of the world. He listed and categorized many of them on his website but admitted that he had "absolutely no idea" how many instruments he owned and played, having gathered them since the 1960s. A journalist described his home in 1994 as containing a "tidal flood of instruments strewn all over the house. In every room. On the floor, balanced against the wall, lying atop cabinets and just literally occupying virtually every inch of available floor space."

Personal life
Lindley married Joan Darrow, the sister of his musical colleague Chris Darrow from the band Kaleidoscope. In 1970, Joan and David Lindley had a daughter named Rosanne who became a folk singer with The Mountain Goats and the Bright Mountain Choir in the 1990s. In 1995, Rosanne joined Lindley in a series of concerts with Ry and his son Joachim Cooder, billed as the Cooder–Lindley Family. The Lindleys lived in a quiet neighborhood of Claremont, California.

Lindley died after a long illness on March 3, 2023, at the age of 78. He had COVID-19 in 2020 which his family said developed into Long COVID with lasting kidney damage.

Selected discography
Solo
1981 : El Rayo-X (Asylum)
1982 : Win This Record! (Asylum)
1983 : El Rayo Live
1985 : Mr. Dave
1988 : Very Greasy (Elektra) #174 US
1991 : The Indian Runner original soundtrack with Jack Nitzsche
1991 : A World Out of Time (Shanachie) with Henry Kaiser in Madagascar
1994 : The Sweet Sunny North (Shanachie Records) with Henry Kaiser in Norway
1994 : Wheels of the Sun by Kazu Matsui (Hermans Records) with Hani Naser
1994 : Official Bootleg #1: Live in Tokyo Playing Real Good with Hani Naser
1995 : Song of Sacajawea  (Rabbit Ears)
1995 : Official Bootleg #2: Live All Over the Place Playing Even Better with Hani Naser
2000 : Twango Bango Deluxe (with Wally Ingram)
2001 : Twango Bango II (with Wally Ingram)
2003 : Twango Bango III (with Wally Ingram)
2004 : Live in Europe (with Wally Ingram)
2007 : David Lindley—Big Twang

With other musicians
with Kaleidoscope
1967 : Side Trips  (Epic) 
1967 : A Beacon from Mars (Epic) 
1969 : Incredible! Kaleidoscope (Epic) 
1970 : Bernice (Epic)

with Graham Nash
1971 : Songs for Beginners (Atlantic)
1974 : Wild Tales (Atlantic)
1980 : Earth & Sky (Capitol)

with Terry Reid
1972 : River (Atlantic)
1976 : Seed of Memory (ABC)

with Jackson Browne
1973 : For Everyman (Asylum)
1974 : Late for the Sky (Asylum)
1976 : The Pretender (Asylum)
1977 : Running on Empty (Asylum)
1980 : Hold Out (Asylum)
1986 : Lives in the Balance (Asylum)
1989 : World in Motion (Elektra)
1993 : I'm Alive (Elektra)
1996 : Looking East (Elektra)
2010 : Love Is Strange: En Vivo Con Tino (Inside Recordings)

with Linda Ronstadt
1974 : Heart Like a Wheel (Capitol) 
1975 : Prisoner in Disguise (Asylum)
1977 : Simple Dreams (Asylum)

with Crosby & Nash
1975 : Wind on the Water (ABC)
1976 : Whistling Down the Wire (ABC)

with Rod Stewart
1975 : Atlantic Crossing (Warner Bros.)
1976 : A Night on the Town (Warner Bros.)

with Warren Zevon
1976 : Warren Zevon 
1987 : Sentimental Hygiene (Virgin)
1989 : Transverse City (Virgin)
1994 : Mutineer (Giant) 
2003 : The Wind (Artemis)

with Ry Cooder
1978 : Jazz (Warner Bros.) 
1979 : Bop Till You Drop (Warner Bros.) 
1995 : Cooder-Lindley Family Live at the Vienna Opera House

with others
1967 : Songs of Leonard Cohen (Columbia) with Leonard Cohen
1969 : Elephant Mountain (RCA) with the Youngbloods
1971 : America (Warner Bros.) America
1973: Maria Muldaur (Reprise Records) Maria Muldaur
1974: Some Days You Eat the Bear (Elektra) Iain Matthews
1976: In the Pocket (Warner Bros) James Taylor
1977: Lonnie Mack and Pismo (Capitol) Lonnie Mack
1977 : Here You Come Again (RCA) with Dolly Parton
1978: Leo Sayer (Warner Bros.) with Leo Sayer
1979 : Restless Nights (Karla Bonoff album) (Columbia) with Karla Bonoff
1981 : There Goes the Neighborhood (Asylum) with Joe Walsh
1987 :   Freight Train Heart with Jimmy Barnes
1987 : Trio (Warner Bros.) with Emmylou Harris, Linda Ronstadt and Dolly Parton
1988 : Ancient Heart  (Reprise Records) with Tanita Tikaram
1989 : Good Evening (Warner Bros.) with Marshall Crenshaw
1990 : Under the Red Sky (Columbia) with Bob Dylan
1992 : Fat City (Columbia) with Shawn Colvin
1997:  Cool & Unusual (Martin Simpson album) (Red House Records) with Martin Simpson
2003 : Oil (Cosmo Sex School Records) with Jerry Joseph and Dzuiks Küche
2006 : Both Sides of the Gun (Virgin) with Ben Harper
2008 : Insides Out (New West Records) with Jordan Zevon
2010 : The Promise (Columbia) with Bruce Springsteen & the E Street Band
2012 : The Devil You Know (Fantasy Records) with Rickie Lee Jones
2015 : Slide Guitar Summit with Arlen Roth (Aquinnah Records)
2017 : The Bucket List (Rocker Chick Media) with the Sound Field

References

External links
 The Official David Lindley Web Page
 Interview on Modern Guitars Magazine
 
 

1944 births
2023 deaths
American oud players
Citternists
Deaths from the COVID-19 pandemic in California 
Pedal steel guitarists
Slide guitarists
American session musicians
Guitarists from California
People from Greater Los Angeles
American mandolinists
American multi-instrumentalists
American rock guitarists
American male guitarists
American banjoists
Lead guitarists
Weissenborn players
Record producers from California
ABC Records artists
Asylum Records artists
Atlantic Records artists
Capitol Records artists
Columbia Records artists
Epic Records artists
RCA Victor artists
Warner Records artists
Virgin Records artists
Steel guitarists
American fiddlers
Resonator guitarists
People from San Marino, California
20th-century American guitarists
21st-century American violinists
20th-century American male musicians
21st-century American male musicians
Inside Out Music artists
Shanachie Records artists